Nightmare Nurse is a 2016 American crime thriller television film directed by Craig Moss. It stars Sarah Butler, Steven Good, Lindsay Hartley, and Traci Lords. The film premiered on March 5, 2016 on Lifetime Television.

Plot
A young couple, Brooke and Lance, are injured in a car accident. At the hospital, Brooke is awakened by a nurse named Barb who informs her that Lance has been seriously injured and is in surgery. Not being able to remember everything that happened, Brooke eventually tells them that she remembers a man crossing the road in front of them just before they hit him, which is strange since Brooke and Lance are the only people who were transported to the hospital. With Lance's upcoming release, it's important that Brooke finds a competent nurse who can look after him while she works. Lance is left to be cared for by an attractive nurse Chloe. However, his health begins to decline after he is administered several doses of Oxycontin, leading Brooke to wonder if his nurse is harming him. Her suspicions are confirmed when a phone call from a stranger brings Chloe's troubled past to light. Soon, they discover that one of the hospital nurses is out to exact revenge.

Cast
 Sarah Butler as Brooke
 Steven Good as Lance
 Lindsay Hartley as Chloe
 Traci Lords as Barb
 René Ashton as Gwen
 Michael Finn as Paul
 Jessica Morris as Connie
 Nate Scholz as James
 David Starzyk as Detective Thames
 Julian Stone as Marco

Production

Casting
Lindsay Hartley was cast without auditioning for the part. "I did not audition for this one. My agent called me over a weekend, and said they made an offer for me to play this part in this movie. They wanted me to read the script in like two hours and get back to them since they started shooting on Tuesday. So, I really quickly read the script and thought it was fantastic, and I loved it. It kind of reminded me of Theresa from Passions having a bad day!"

Release

Critical reception
Inquisitr compared the film to another Lifetime television film Widow on the Hill (2005), which was said to be based on a true story of Donna Somerville, a nurse who was accused of killing her patient, and eventual husband.

References

External links
 
 

2016 crime thriller films
2016 television films
2016 films
2010s English-language films
American crime thriller films
American television films
Films set in California
Films shot in California
Films directed by Craig Moss
2010s American films